Emma Jean Hawes (née Fisher; July 5, 1912 – July 28, 1987) was an American bridge player.  She won 11 national titles and four world titles during her career.

Hawes was born in Benton, Kentucky and graduated from Cornell University at only 18 years old. For 15 years she partnered with New Yorker Dorothy Hayden Truscott.

She died at her home in Fort Worth, Texas of breast cancer. She was survived by her husband, David Hawes, and their daughter, Evalie Horner. Hawes was inducted into the ACBL Hall of Fame  in 2002.

Bridge accomplishments

Honors

 ACBL Hall of Fame, 2002

Wins

 North American Bridge Championships (12)
 Whitehead Women's Pairs (1) 1981 
 Open Pairs (1928-1962) (1) 1958 
 Smith Life Master Women's Pairs (2) 1966, 1978 
 Wagar Women's Knockout Teams (6) 1967, 1970, 1972, 1974, 1975, 1976 
 Marcus Cup (1) 1958 
 Chicago Mixed Board-a-Match (1) 1964

Runners-up

 North American Bridge Championships
 Whitehead Women's Pairs (2) 1968, 1976 
 Smith Life Master Women's Pairs (1) 1972 
 Chicago Mixed Board-a-Match (3) 1952, 1967, 1972

References

External links
 
 
 Women Stars at the World Bridge Federation – with biographies (Hawes)

1912 births
1987 deaths
American contract bridge players
Cornell University alumni
People from Fort Worth, Texas
People from Benton, Kentucky
Deaths from cancer in Texas
Kentucky women contract bridge players
20th-century American women
20th-century American people